Events from the year 1861 in Denmark.

Incumbents
 Monarch – Frederick VII
 Prime minister – Carl Christian Hall

Events

 July – The archaeological excavations at the Jelling Stones are resumed under supervision of Jens Jacob Asmussen Worsaae and later that month visited by King Frederik VII personally.
 25 August – St. John's Church in the Nørrebro district of Copenhagen is consecrated at a ceremony attended by King Frederik VII. It is first church to be built outside the city's old fortification ring when it was decommissioned.
 13 September – The Church Association for the Inner Mission in Denmark is founded.

Undated

Publications
 2 March – New Fairy Tales and Stories by Hans Christian Andersen

Births
 10 February – Walter Christmas, author (died 1924)
 14 February – Peter Ilsted, artist and printmaker (died 1933)
 27 April – Johan Skjoldborg, author (died 1936)
 29 April – Holger Hvidtfeldt Jerichau, painter (died 1900)
 22 May – Johannes Georg Forchhammer, physicist (died 1938)
 10 September – Niels Hansen Jacobsen, sculptor (died 1941)
 25 September – Rasmus Andersen, sculptor (died 1930)

Deaths
 2 April – Peter Georg Bang, politician and jurist, prime minister of Denmark (born 1797)
 1 May – Heinrich Gustav Ferdinand Holm, artist and engraver (born 1803)
 28 August – Jonas Collin, philanthropist (born 1776)

References

 
1860s in Denmark
Denmark
Years of the 19th century in Denmark